Grenada is an overwhelmingly Christian majority country, with adherents of Islam being a minuscule minority. Due to secular nature of the Grenada's constitution, Muslims are free to proselytize and build places of worship in the country. There are over 500 Muslims in Grenada. They make up 0.75% of the population.

Culture 
There are two mosques in Grenada. The Muslims of Grenada have close relations with Trinidadian Muslims.

References

Grenada
Gre
Religion in Grenada